was a Japanese samurai of the Sengoku period.
He was second son of Miyoshi Yoshikata who was adopted by Sogō Kazumasa from the Sogō clan.

In 1582, Masayasu was defeated by Chōsokabe Motochika`s large army during the battle of Nakatomigawa, abandoned Shōzui Castle and asked Toyotomi Hideyoshi for help.

In 1585, he participated in Hideyoshi's successful campaign in Shikoku against Chosokabe clan.

He died during the Kyushu campaign against the Shimazu clan as a result of Sengoku Hidehisa`s reckless actions at the battle of Hetsugigawa in 1587.

References

Samurai
1533 births
1587 deaths
Miyoshi clan
Japanese warriors killed in battle
People from Tokushima Prefecture